Proprioception, also referred to as kinaesthesia (or kinesthesia), is the sense of self-movement, force, and body position. It is sometimes described as the "sixth sense".

Proprioception is mediated by proprioceptors, mechanosensory neurons located within muscles, tendons, and joints. Most animals possess multiple subtypes of proprioceptors, which detect distinct kinematic parameters, such as joint position, movement, and load. Although all mobile animals possess proprioceptors, the structure of the sensory organs can vary across species.

Proprioceptive signals are transmitted to the central nervous system, where they are integrated with information from other sensory systems, such as the visual system and the vestibular system, to create an overall representation of body position, movement, and acceleration. In many animals, sensory feedback from proprioceptors is essential for stabilizing body posture and coordinating body movement.

System overview
In vertebrates, limb velocity and movement (muscle length and the rate of change) are encoded by one group of sensory neurons (Type Ia sensory fiber) and another type encode static muscle length (Group II neurons). These two types of sensory neurons compose muscle spindles. There is a similar division of encoding in invertebrates; different subgroups of neurons of the Chordotonal organ encode limb position and velocity.

To determine the load on a limb, vertebrates use sensory neurons in the Golgi tendon organs: type Ib afferents. These proprioceptors are activated at given muscle forces, which indicate the resistance that muscle is experiencing. Similarly, invertebrates have a mechanism to determine limb load: the Campaniform sensilla. These proprioceptors are active when a limb experiences resistance.

A third role for proprioceptors is to determine when a joint is at a specific position. In vertebrates, this is accomplished by Ruffini endings and Pacinian corpuscles. These proprioceptors are activated when the joint is at a threshold, usually at the extremes of joint position. Invertebrates use hair plates to accomplish this; a row of bristles located along joints detect when the limb moves.

Reflexes
The sense of proprioception is ubiquitous across mobile animals and is essential for the motor coordination of the body. Proprioceptors can form reflex circuits with motor neurons to provide rapid feedback about body and limb position. These mechanosensory circuits are important for flexibly maintaining posture and balance, especially during locomotion. For example, consider the stretch reflex, in which stretch across a muscle is detected by a sensory receptor (e.g., muscle spindle, chordotonal neurons), which activates a motor neuron to induce muscle contraction and oppose the stretch. During locomotion, sensory neurons can reverse their activity when stretched, to promote rather than oppose movement.

Conscious and non-conscious

In humans, a distinction is made between conscious proprioception and non-conscious proprioception:
 Conscious proprioception is communicated by the dorsal column-medial lemniscus pathway to the cerebrum.
 Non-conscious proprioception is communicated primarily via the dorsal spinocerebellar tract and ventral spinocerebellar tract, to the cerebellum.
 A non-conscious reaction is seen in the human proprioceptive reflex, or righting reflex—in the event that the body tilts in any direction, the person will cock their head back to level the eyes against the horizon. This is seen even in infants as soon as they gain control of their neck muscles. This control comes from the cerebellum, the part of the brain affecting balance.

Mechanisms 
Proprioception is mediated by mechanically sensitive proprioceptor neurons distributed throughout an animal's body. Most vertebrates possess three basic types of proprioceptors: muscle spindles, which are embedded in skeletal muscles, Golgi tendon organs, which lie at the interface of muscles and tendons, and joint receptors, which are low-threshold mechanoreceptors embedded in joint capsules. Many invertebrates, such as insects, also possess three basic proprioceptor types with analogous functional properties: chordotonal neurons, campaniform sensilla, and hair plates.

The initiation of proprioception is the activation of a proprioceptor in the periphery. The proprioceptive sense is believed to be composed of information from sensory neurons located in the inner ear (motion and orientation) and in the stretch receptors located in the muscles and the joint-supporting ligaments (stance). There are specific nerve receptors for this form of perception termed "proprioceptors", just as there are specific receptors for pressure, light, temperature, sound, and other sensory experiences. Proprioceptors are sometimes known as adequate stimuli receptors.

Members of the transient receptor potential family of ion channels have been found to be important for proprioception in fruit flies, nematode worms, African clawed frogs, and zebrafish. PIEZO2, a nonselective cation channel, has been shown to underlie the mechanosensitivity of proprioceptors in mice. Humans with loss-of-function mutations in the PIEZO2 gene exhibit specific deficits in joint proprioception, as well as vibration and touch discrimination, suggesting that the PIEZO2 channel is essential for mechanosensitivity in some proprioceptors and low-threshold mechanoreceptors.

Although it was known that finger kinesthesia relies on skin sensation, recent research has found that kinesthesia-based haptic perception relies strongly on the forces experienced during touch. This research allows the creation of "virtual", illusory haptic shapes with different perceived qualities.

Anatomy 
Proprioception of the head stems from the muscles innervated by the trigeminal nerve, where the GSA fibers pass without synapsing in the trigeminal ganglion (first-order sensory neuron), reaching the mesencephalic tract and the mesencephalic nucleus of trigeminal nerve. Proprioception of limbs often occurs due to receptors in connective tissue near joints.

Function

Stability 
An important role for proprioception is to allow an animal to stabilize itself against perturbations. For instance, for a person to walk or stand upright, they must continuously monitor their posture and adjust muscle activity as needed to provide balance. Similarly, when walking on unfamiliar terrain or even tripping, the person must adjust the output of their muscles quickly based on estimated limb position and velocity. Proprioceptor reflex circuits are thought to play an important role to allow fast and unconscious execution of these behaviors, To make control of these behaviors efficient, proprioceptors are also thought to regulate reciprocal inhibition in muscles, leading to agonist-antagonist muscle pairs.

Planning and refining movements 
When planning complex movements such as reaching or grooming, animals must consider the current position and velocity of their limb and use it to adjust dynamics to target a final position. If the animal's estimate of their limb's initial position is wrong, this can lead to a deficiency in the movement. Furthermore, proprioception is crucial in refining the movement if it deviates from the trajectory.

Development
In adult fruit flies, each proprioceptor class arises from a specific cell lineage (i.e. each chordotonal neuron is from the chordotonal neuron lineage, although multiple lineages give rise to sensory bristles).  After the last cell division, proprioceptors send out axons toward the central nervous system and are guided by hormonal gradients to reach stereotyped synapses.

The mechanisms underlying axon guidance are similar across invertebrates and vertebrates.

In mammals with longer gestation periods, muscle spindles are fully formed at birth.  Muscle spindles continue to grow throughout post-natal development as muscles grow.

Mathematical models 
Proprioceptors transfer the mechanical state of the body into patterns of neural activity. This transfer can be modeled mathematically, for example to better understand the internal workings of a proprioceptor or to provide more realistic feedback in neuromechanical simulations.

Various proprioceptor models of complexity have been developed. They range from simple phenomenological models to complex structural models, in which the mathematical elements correspond to anatomical features of the proprioceptor. The focus has been on muscle spindles, but Golgi tendon organs and insects hair plates have been modeled too.

Muscle spindles 
Poppelle and Bowman  used linear system theory to model mammalian muscle spindles Ia and II afferents. They obtained a set of de-afferented muscle spindles, measured their response to a series of sinusoidal and step function stretches, and fit a transfer function to the spike rate. They found that the following Laplace transfer function describes the firing rate responses of the primary sensory fibers for a change in length:

The following equation describes the response of secondary sensory fibers:

More recently, Blum et al.  showed that the muscle spindle firing rate is modeled better as tracking the force of the muscle, rather than the length. Furthermore, muscle spindle firing rates show history dependence which cannot be modeled by a linear time-invariant system model.

Golgi tendon organs 
Houk and Simon  provided one of the first mathematical models of a Golgi tendon organ receptor, modeling the firing rate of the receptor as a function of the muscle tension force. Just as for muscle spindles, they find that, as the receptors respond linearly to sine waves of different frequencies and has little variance in response over time to the same stimulus, Golgi tendon organ receptors may be modeled as linear time-invariant systems. Specifically, they find that the firing rate of a Golgi tendon organ receptor may be modeled as a sum of 3 decaying exponentials:

The corresponding Laplace transfer function for this system is:

For a soleus receptor, Houk and Simon obtain average values of K=57 pulses/sec/kg, A=0.31, a=0.22 sec−1, B=0.4, b=2.17 sec−1, C=2.5, c=36 sec−1 .

When modeling a stretch reflex, Lin and Crago improved upon this model by adding a logarithmic nonlinearity before the Houk and Simon model and a threshold nonlinearity after.

Impairment

Chronic 
Proprioception, a sense vital for rapid and proper body coordination, can be permanently lost or impaired as a result of genetic conditions, disease, viral infections, and injuries. For instance, patients with joint hypermobility or Ehlers-Danlos syndrome, a genetic condition that results in weak connective tissue throughout the body, have chronic impairments to proprioception. Moreover, proprioception may be chronically impaired in physiological aging (presbypropria), autism spectrum disorder, and Parkinson's disease. In regards to Parkinson's disease, it remains unclear whether the proprioceptive-related decline in motor function occurs due to disrupted proprioceptors in the periphery or signaling in the spinal cord or brain.  

In rare cases, viral infections result in a loss of proprioception. Ian Waterman and Charles Freed are two such people that lost their sense of proprioception from the neck down from supposed viral infections (i.e. gastric flu and a rare viral infection). After losing their sense of proprioception, Ian and Charles could move their lower body, but could not coordinate their movements. However, both individuals regained some control of their limbs and body by consciously planning their movements and relying solely on visual feedback. Interestingly, both individuals can still sense pain and temperature, indicating that they specifically lost proprioceptive feedback, but not tactile and nociceptive feedback. The impact of losing the sense of proprioception on daily life is perfectly illustrated when Ian Waterman stated, "What is an active brain without mobility".  

Proprioception is also permanently lost in people who lose a limb or body part through injury or amputation. After the removal of a limb, people may have a confused sense of that limb's existence on their body, known as phantom limb syndrome. Phantom sensations can occur as passive proprioceptive sensations of the limb's presence, or more active sensations such as perceived movement, pressure, pain, itching, or temperature. There are a variety of theories concerning the etiology of phantom limb sensations and experience. One is the concept of "proprioceptive memory", which argues that the brain retains a memory of specific limb positions and that after amputation there is a conflict between the visual system, which actually sees that the limb is missing, and the memory system which remembers the limb as a functioning part of the body. Phantom sensations and phantom pain may also occur after the removal of body parts other than the limbs, such as after amputation of the breast, extraction of a tooth (phantom tooth pain), or removal of an eye (phantom eye syndrome).

Acute 
Proprioception is occasionally impaired spontaneously, especially when one is tired. Similar effects can be felt during the hypnagogic state of consciousness, during the onset of sleep. One's body may feel too large or too small, or parts of the body may feel distorted in size. Similar effects can sometimes occur during epilepsy or migraine auras. These effects are presumed to arise from abnormal stimulation of the part of the parietal cortex of the brain involved with integrating information from different parts of the body. Proprioceptive illusions can also be induced, such as the Pinocchio illusion.

Temporary impairment of proprioception has also been known to occur from an overdose of vitamin B6 (pyridoxine and pyridoxamine). Most of the impaired function returns to normal shortly after the amount of the vitamin in the body returns to a level that is closer to that of the physiological norm. Impairment can also be caused by cytotoxic factors such as chemotherapy.

It has been proposed that even common tinnitus and the attendant hearing frequency-gaps masked by the perceived sounds may cause erroneous proprioceptive information to the balance and comprehension centers of the brain, precipitating mild confusion.

Temporary loss or impairment of proprioception may happen periodically during growth, mostly during adolescence. Growth that might also influence this would be large increases or drops in bodyweight/size due to fluctuations of fat (liposuction, rapid fat loss or gain) and/or muscle content (bodybuilding, anabolic steroids, catabolisis/starvation). It can also occur in those that gain new levels of flexibility, stretching, and contortion. A limb's being in a new range of motion never experienced (or at least, not for a long time since youth perhaps) can disrupt one's sense of location of that limb. Possible experiences include suddenly feeling that feet or legs are missing from one's mental self-image; needing to look down at one's limbs to be sure they are still there; and falling down while walking, especially when attention is focused upon something other than the act of walking.

Diagnosis
Impaired proprioception may be diagnosed through a series of tests, each focusing on a different functional aspect of proprioception.

The Romberg's test is often used to assess balance. The subject must stand with feet together and eyes closed without support for 30 seconds. If the subject loses balance and falls, it is an indicator for impaired proprioception.

For evaluating proprioception's contribution to motor control, a common protocol is joint position matching. The patient is blindfolded while a joint is moved to a specific angle for a given period of time and then returned to neutral. The subject is then asked to move the joint back to the specified angle. Recent investigations have shown that hand dominance, participant age, active versus passive matching, and presentation time of the angle can all affect performance on joint position matching tasks.

For passive sensing of joint angles, recent studies have found that experiments to probe psychophysical thresholds produce more precise estimates of proprioceptive discrimination than the joint position matching task. In these experiments, the subject holds on to an object (such as an armrest) that moves and stops at different positions. The subject must discriminate whether one position is closer to the body than another. From the subject's choices, the tester may determine the subject's discrimination thresholds.

Proprioception is tested by American police officers using the field sobriety testing to check for alcohol intoxication.

Training
Proprioception is what allows someone to learn to walk in complete darkness without losing balance. During the learning of any new skill, sport, or art, it is usually necessary to become familiar with some proprioceptive tasks specific to that activity. Without the appropriate integration of proprioceptive input, an artist would not be able to brush paint onto a canvas without looking at the hand as it moved the brush over the canvas; it would be impossible to drive an automobile because a motorist would not be able to steer or use the pedals while looking at the road ahead; a person could not touch type or perform ballet; and people would not even be able to walk without watching where they put their feet.

Oliver Sacks reported the case of a young woman who lost her proprioception due to a viral infection of her spinal cord. At first she could not move properly at all or even control her tone of voice (as voice modulation is primarily proprioceptive). Later she relearned by using her sight (watching her feet) and inner ear only for movement while using hearing to judge voice modulation. She eventually acquired a stiff and slow movement and nearly normal speech, which is believed to be the best possible in the absence of this sense. She could not judge effort involved in picking up objects and would grip them painfully to be sure she did not drop them.

The proprioceptive sense can be sharpened through study of many disciplines. Juggling trains reaction time, spatial location, and efficient movement. Standing on a wobble board or balance board is often used to retrain or increase proprioceptive abilities, particularly as physical therapy for ankle or knee injuries. Slacklining is another method to increase proprioception.

Standing on one leg (stork standing) and various other body-position challenges are also used in such disciplines as yoga, Wing Chun and tai chi. The vestibular system of the inner ear, vision and proprioception are the main three requirements for balance. Moreover, there are specific devices designed for proprioception training, such as the exercise ball, which works on balancing the abdominal and back muscles.

History of study
In 1557, the position-movement sensation was described by Julius Caesar Scaliger as a "sense of locomotion".

In 1826, Charles Bell expounded the idea of a "muscle sense", which is credited as one of the first descriptions of physiologic feedback mechanisms. Bell's idea was that commands are carried from the brain to the muscles, and that reports on the muscle's condition would be sent in the reverse direction.

In 1847, the London neurologist Robert Todd highlighted important differences in the anterolateral and posterior columns of the spinal cord, and suggested that the latter were involved in the coordination of movement and balance.

At around the same time, Moritz Heinrich Romberg, a Berlin neurologist, was describing unsteadiness made worse by eye closure or darkness, now known as the eponymous Romberg's sign, once synonymous with tabes dorsalis, that became recognised as common to all proprioceptive disorders of the legs.

In 1880, Henry Charlton Bastian suggested "kinaesthesia" instead of "muscle sense" on the basis that some of the afferent information (back to the brain) comes from other structures, including tendons, joints, and skin.

In 1889, Alfred Goldscheider suggested a classification of kinaesthesia into three types: muscle, tendon, and articular sensitivity.

In 1906, the term proprio-ception (and also intero-ception and extero-ception) is attested in a publication by Charles Scott Sherrington involving receptors. He explains the terminology as follows:

The main fields of distribution of the receptor organs fundamentally distinguishable seem, therefore, to be two, namely, a surface field constituted by the surface layer of the organism, and a deep field constituted by the tissues of the organism beneath the surface sheet.
[...]
the stimulations occurring in [the] deep field is that the stimuli are traceable to actions of the organism itself, and are so in much greater measure than are the stimulations of the surface field of the organism. Since in the deep field the stimuli to the receptors are delivered by the organism itself, the deep receptors may be termed proprio-ceptors, and the deep field a field of proprio-ception.

Today, the "exteroceptors" are the organs that provide information originating outside the body, such as the eyes, ears, mouth, and skin. The interoceptors provide information about the internal organs, and the "proprioceptors" provide information about movement derived from muscular, tendon, and articular sources. Using Sherrington's system, physiologists and anatomists search for specialised nerve endings that transmit mechanical data on joint capsule, tendon and muscle tension (such as Golgi tendon organs and muscle spindles), which play a large role in proprioception.

Primary endings of muscle spindles "respond to the size of a muscle length change and its speed" and "contribute both to the sense of limb position and movement".  Secondary endings of muscle spindles detect changes in muscle length, and thus supply information regarding only the sense of position. Essentially, muscle spindles are stretch receptors. It has been accepted that cutaneous receptors also contribute directly to proprioception by providing "accurate perceptual information about joint position and movement", and this knowledge is combined with information from the muscle spindles.

Etymology
Proprioception is from Latin proprius, meaning "one's own", "individual", and capio, capere, to take or grasp. Thus to grasp one's own position in space, including the position of the limbs in relation to each other and the body as a whole.

The word kinesthesia or kinæsthesia (kinesthetic sense) refers to  movement sense, but has been used inconsistently to refer either to proprioception alone or to the brain's integration of proprioceptive and vestibular inputs. Kinesthesia is a modern medical term composed of elements from Greek; kinein "to set in motion; to move" (from PIE root *keie- "to set in motion") + aisthesis "perception, feeling" (from PIE root *au- "to perceive").

Plants and bacteria 
Although they lack neurons, a form of proprioception has also been described in some plants (angiosperms). Terrestrial plants control the orientation of their primary growth through the sensing of several vectorial stimuli such as the light gradient or the gravitational acceleration. This control has been called tropism. A quantitative study of shoot gravitropism demonstrated that, when a plant is tilted, it cannot recover a steady erected posture under the sole driving of the sensing of its angular deflection versus gravity. An additional control through the continuous sensing of its curvature by the organ and the subsequent driving an active straightening process are required.  Being a sensing by the plant of the relative configuration of its parts, it has been called proprioception.  This dual sensing and control by gravisensing and proprioception has been formalized into a unifying mathematical model simulating the complete driving of the gravitropic movement. This model has been validated on 11 species sampling the phylogeny of land angiosperms, and on organs of very contrasted sizes, ranging from the small germination of wheat (coleoptile) to the trunk of poplar trees.

Further studies have shown that the cellular mechanism of proprioception in plants involves myosin and actin, and seems  to occur in specialized cells.  Proprioception was then found to be involved in other tropisms and to be central also to the control of nutation.

The discovery of proprioception in plants has generated an interest in the popular science and generalist media. This is because this discovery questions a long-lasting a priori that we have on plants. In some cases this has led to a shift between proprioception and self-awareness or self-consciousness. There is no scientific ground for such a semantic shift. Indeed, even in animals, proprioception can be unconscious;  so it is thought to be in plants.

Preliminary research indicates that bacteria may display proprioception.

See also

Notes

References

External links 
 

 
Articles containing video clips
Sensory systems